Mahmoud Mohamad El Ali (born 4 March 1984) is a Lebanese former professional footballer who played as a striker. El Ali represented the Lebanon national team, scoring 12 goals in 46 games, before being banned for life from professional football due to his involvement in the 2013 Lebanese match fixing scandal.

Club career 
El Ali began his senior career at Lebanese Premier League club Rayyan, during the 2004–05 season. The forward scored five goals. In 2005 El Ali moved to Ahed, scoring four goals and helping his side finish in fifth place during the 2005–06 season. The following season (2006–07), El Ali improved on his previous season's numbers, scoring 12 goals. However, Ahed finished in fifth place once again. In 2007–08, El Ali helped his side win their first league title, scoring three goals.

The following three seasons, El Ali lifted two more league titles (2009–10 and 2010–11), two Lebanese FA Cups (2008–09 and 2010–11), three Lebanese Elite Cups (2008, 2010, and 2011), and three Lebanese Super Cups (2008, 2010, 2011). The forward was also part of the Lebanese Premier League Team of the Season for two consecutive seasons, in 2010–11 and 2011–12.

In January 2013, El Ali moved to Indonesian Liga 1 side Persiba Balikpapan. He scored three goals in 16 league games. On 26 February 2013, El Ali was accused of illegal betting on several national and continental games concerning Lebanese teams and the national team. He was banned for life from football and was fined $15,000. Following El Ali's involvement in the 2013 Lebanese match-fixing scandal, on 26 April 2013, Persiba Balikpapan terminated El Ali's contract with the club.

International career 
El Ali made his international debut for Lebanon 16 June 2007, at the 2007 WAFF Championship, against Syria; Lebanon lost 1–0. The Lebanese forward's first international goal came on 23 September 2007, in a friendly against the United Arab Emirates (UAE); the match finished in a 1–1 draw. On 17 July 2011, El Ali scored his first, and only, international brace; he scored twice against the UAE in a friendly.

In 2013, El Ali was accused of match fixing a 2014 FIFA World Cup qualification game against Qatar, on 14 November 2012, purposely throwing the match in the opponents favour. Lebanon lost 1–0. Following the investigations, on 24 April 2013 El Ali was banned for life from the sport. El Ali retired with 12 goals in 46 appearances for the national team.

Career statistics

International

Honours
Ahed
 Lebanese Premier League: 2007–08, 2009–10, 2010–11
 Lebanese FA Cup: 2008–09, 2010–11
 Lebanese Elite Cup: 2008, 2010, 2011
 Lebanese Super Cup: 2008, 2010, 2011

Individual
 Lebanese Premier League Team of the Season: 2006–07, 2007–08, 2010–11, 2011–12

See also
 List of Lebanon international footballers

References

External links
 
 Mahmoud El Ali at RSSSF
 

1984 births
Living people
People from Akkar Governorate
Lebanese footballers
Association football forwards
Al Rayyan SC Beirut players
Al Ahed FC players
Persiba Balikpapan players
Lebanese Premier League players
Liga 1 (Indonesia) players
Lebanon international footballers
Lebanese expatriate footballers
Expatriate footballers in Indonesia
Lebanese expatriate sportspeople in Indonesia
Match fixers
Sportspeople banned for life